Syrkin is a surname. In Slavic countries it is reserved for males, while its feminine counterpart is Syrkina. It may refer to
Daniel Syrkin (born 1971), Israeli cinema and TV director and screenwriter
Marie Syrkin (1899–1989), American author, schoolteacher and university professor, daughter of Nachman
Nachman Syrkin (1868–1924), Russian-born political theorist